The 2014 Syracuse Orange men's soccer team represented Syracuse University during the 2014 NCAA Division I men's soccer season.

Standings

Schedule

Spring season

See also 

 Syracuse Orange men's soccer
 2014 Atlantic Coast Conference men's soccer season
 2014 NCAA Division I men's soccer season
 2014 ACC Men's Soccer Tournament
 2014 NCAA Division I Men's Soccer Championship

References 

2014
2014 Atlantic Coast Conference men's soccer season
2014 in sports in New York (state)
American men's college soccer teams 2014 season